A list of books and essays about Roman Polanski:

Polanksi
Bibliography